Francisco Garrido Peña (born 25 March 1958 in Seville, Spain) is a Spanish politician and member of the Green Party, which has previously supported the Spanish Socialist Workers' Party (PSOE) in the Spanish Congress of Deputies.

Garrido received a Doctorate in philosophy from the University of Granada, and became a University professor in Jaen. He sat in the Parliament of Andalusia from 1994 to 1996 after being elected in the lists of the United Left. In 2004, following a pact between the PSOE and the Greens, he was elected to the Spanish Congress in the PSOE lists representing Seville Province and served until 2008.

References

External links
European Green Party Website 

1958 births
Living people
People from Seville
Members of the 8th Congress of Deputies (Spain)
Spanish Socialist Workers' Party politicians
Members of the Parliament of Andalusia
United Left (Spain) politicians